Jean Black Ngody (born 21 January 1978 in Mudeka) is a former Cameroonian footballer and current anchor of Chiltern Voice.

Career
He previously played for Górnik Zabrze and Stomil Olsztyn in the Polish Ekstraklasa and various clubs in England, Greece, and Wales.

Club career

References

1978 births
Living people
Cameroonian footballers
F.C. Aboomoslem players
Expatriate footballers in Iran
Payam Mashhad players
Expatriate footballers in England
Cameroonian expatriate sportspeople in Greece
Expatriate footballers in Malaysia
Górnik Zabrze players
Cameroonian expatriate sportspeople in Malaysia
Expatriate footballers in Greece
Cameroonian expatriate footballers
Expatriate footballers in Wales
Cameroonian expatriate sportspeople in Wales
Expatriate footballers in Poland
Perlis FA players
Cameroonian expatriate sportspeople in Poland
Association football forwards
Cameroonian expatriate sportspeople in England
Cameroonian expatriate sportspeople in Iran